A New Day Yesterday is the debut studio album by American blues rock musician Joe Bonamassa. Recorded at Pyramid Recording Studios in Ithaca, New York, it was produced by Tom Dowd and released on October 24, 2000 by independent record label Okeh in tandem with Epic Records and 550 Music. The album registered at number 9 on the US Billboard Top Blues Albums chart and spawned the singles "Miss You, Hate You" in 2001 and "Colour and Shape" in 2002.

Taking its title from the song of the same name by British progressive rock band Jethro Tull, a recording of which is featured on the album, A New Day Yesterday features six original tracks written by Bonamassa and others, in addition to six cover versions of songs by classic blues and rock artists. The album was reviewed positively by critics, who praised Bonamassa's performances throughout on both the original and cover songs, identifying it as a strong debut release.

To mark the album's 20th anniversary, A New Day Yesterday was remixed, remastered and released in 2020 under the title A New Day Now: 20th Anniversary Edition. The reissue was produced by Kevin Shirley, features re-recorded vocal tracks, and includes three previously unreleased recordings from 1997 produced by Steven Van Zandt. A New Day Now topped the US Billboard Blues Albums chart. The anniversary edition of "Colour and Shape" was also released as a single.

Background and release
Joe Bonamassa recorded his debut album at Pyramid Recording Studios in Ithaca, New York, working with producer Tom Dowd, and engineers Alex Perialas and Jason Arnold. His backing band included bassist Greg "Creamo" Liss and drummer Tony Cintron, with a number of guest musicians also contributing to the recordings (including guitarists Rick Derringer and Leslie West, and keyboardists Gregg Allman and David Borden). A New Day Yesterday was released on October 24, 2000 by Okeh in tandem with Epic Records and 550 Music. "Miss You, Hate You" was released as the first single from the album in 2001, including a music video which received airplay on shows including Chicago, Illinois-based JBTV and Brockton, Massachusetts-based Rage. "Colour and the Shape" was issued as a promotional single in 2002.

After an initial low-key release, A New Day Yesterday "caught the ears of veteran record executives", according to CNN's Simon Umlauf, and was rereleased in September 2001 by Medalist Entertainment. Later reissues would follow in 2004 and 2009 by J&R Adventures (Bonamassa's own record label), in 2005 by Provogue Records and in 2012 by Mascot Records. All later releases include the original full-length version of "Miss You, Hate You" as a bonus track. The album was promoted on a North American concert tour throughout 2001, the final date of which (December 12, 2001) was recorded for the 2002 live album A New Day Yesterday Live.

In 2020, the album was rereleased as "A New Day Now - 20th Anniversary Edition". For this release, Bonamassa re-recorded the vocals, the album was remastered as well and included extra bonus tracks.

Reception

Commercial
Despite being released almost two years earlier, A New Day Yesterday debuted at number 9 on the US Billboard Top Blues Albums chart in the week of August 17, 2002. Bonamassa's second studio album So, It's Like That would enter the chart at number 2 just two weeks later. The album has the lowest peak position on the chart, with all of Bonamassa's future releases reaching higher than number 9.

Critical

A New Day Yesterday received positive reviews from critics. AllMusic's Eduardo Rivadavia described the album as "a fine debut by guitar ace Joe Bonamassa", claiming that it proves the guitarist and vocalist to be "much more than a traditional bluesman". Rivadavia highlighted several songs on the album, including "A New Day Yesterday", the cover of which he dubbed "a jaw-dropping performance", the singles "Miss You, Hate You" and "Colour and the Shape", which he described as a "jolting double whammy" and "the most obvious standouts", and "If Heartaches Were Nickels", which he suggested featured "a tense, riveting performance". In a review of the album's lead single "Miss You, Hate You", Chuck Taylor of Billboard magazine praised Bonamassa as "a bold talent, who rises above narrow radio formatics", outlining that the song "throws in all the ingredients of a classic rock moment, led by a thrush of driving guitars ... and a vocal that sounds like sandpaper against velcro".

Track listing

Personnel

Musicians
Joe Bonamassa – guitar, vocals
Creamo Liss – bass
Tony Cintron – drums
Annie and Jeannie Burns – vocals (tracks 5 and 13)
Rick Derringer – vocals and guitar solo (track 6)
David Borden – keyboards (track 8)
Len Bonamassa – guitar (track 9)
Leslie West – vocals and guitar solo (track 10)
Gregg Allman – vocals and organ (track 10)

Additional personnel
Tom Dowd – producer
Alex Perialas – production assistance, engineering, mixing
Jason Arnold – additional engineering
Vlado Meller – mastering
Bob Held – mixing (track 5)
Scott Hull – mastering (track 5)
Stephen Byram – artwork, design
Julia Kuskin – photography
Mark Avers – photography

A New Day Now personnel
Joe Bonamassa – liner notes
Kate Moss – design
Kevin Shirley – additional recording and production, mixing, liner notes
Brent Spear – tape transfer
Steven Van Zandt – production

Chart positions

References

External links

2000 debut albums
Joe Bonamassa albums
Albums produced by Tom Dowd